Pentti Pelkonen (born 20 March 1930) is a Finnish cross-country skier. He competed in the men's 50 kilometre event at the 1960 Winter Olympics.

Cross-country skiing results

Olympic Games

References

External links
 

1930 births
Living people
Finnish male cross-country skiers
Olympic cross-country skiers of Finland
Cross-country skiers at the 1960 Winter Olympics
Sportspeople from Saint Petersburg
20th-century Finnish people